Eublemma latericolor is a species of moth in the family Erebidae. The species was originally described by Alfred Jefferis Turner in 1945.

Description 
Eublemma latericolor is 20–22 mm in length. Head, thorax, and abdomen are reddish-grey, while extremities and antennae are pale grey. The forewings have a triangular shape, the hindwings are rounded; both are finely patterned.

Range 
Observations of Eublemma latericolor have been documented in the north of Queensland in 1945. Recent crowdsourced observations confirmed that this moth species can be observed there

References

Boletobiinae
Taxa named by Alfred Jefferis Turner
Moths described in 1945